Farouk Gaafar فاروق جعفر (Nick Names: Roo-a & King of Midfield) is an Egyptian former football player and manager.

He played midfielder for Zamalek and the Egypt national football team. He finished eighth in the magazine France Football voting for the 1975 African Player of the Year.

Following his playing career, Gaafar managed Egypt during 1996 and 1997 and later El Geish club.

Managerial statistics

Honours

As a player
Zamalek
Egyptian Premier League: 2
 1977–78, 1983–84
Egypt Cup: 3
 1975, 1977, 1979
African Cup of Champions Clubs: 2
 1984, 1986

Individual
 Best Playmaker in African Cup of Nations 1974
 Best Playmaker in African Cup of Nations 1976
 7th African footballer of the year by France Football 1975
 8th African footballer of the year by France Football 1977

References

 angelfire.com

External links
 
 
 
 angelfire.com

Living people
Association football midfielders
Egyptian footballers
Egypt international footballers
1974 African Cup of Nations players
1976 African Cup of Nations players
African Games silver medalists for Egypt
African Games medalists in football
Zamalek SC players
Egyptian football managers
Egypt national football team managers
Zamalek SC managers
1952 births
Ismaily SC managers
Egyptian Premier League players
Footballers at the 1973 All-Africa Games
African Games bronze medalists for Egypt